River Douglas railway station was a former railway station of the West Lancashire Railway (WLR) on the Southport-Preston Line in North West England, which opened in 1878.

History
The station was 'passed for traffic' on 13 July 1878 and opened on 1 August, consisting of two platforms for the line's double tracks. Steps from the eastern end of each platform led to small wharf where the WLR operated a paddle steamer, the Virginia, up the Douglas and across the River Ribble to Lytham St Annes. Another vessel operated to Naze Point at Freckleton and it appears the station was specifically built to facilitate these services. However, the services operated at a loss and ceased sailing after the summer of 1879.

A temporary wooden bridge and a large crane was built in 1877 to the north of the station upon which a single siding ran, which served steam barges operated by the WLR using in the construction of the railway line. The barges carried building materials from the Leeds and Liverpool Canal and the crane would load the materials into railway wagons. The wooden bridge was demolished when the swing bridge opened. Also located at the station were other sidings - eventually four in total - including ones that ran to brickworks north and south of the station.

The swing bridge was controlled from the station's signal box, and would open to allow tall-masted vessels passage up and down the river; in September 1913, the bridge was welded shut as sailing vessels no longer navigated the river. Although the bridge was not yet built when River Douglas station opened, the station was built as a through station, and on 18 May 1882 a  extension was opened to Longton, and through to the WLR's near terminus at Fishergate Hill in Preston in September. By then there were no sailings from the WLR's wharf at River Douglas but the station appears to have remained open as a "request stop" for the few passengers who still used it.

The station closed on 25 April 1889 and the buildings and platforms were subsequently demolished, and the site became an industrial yard. The swing bridge was demolished after the line closed on 7 September 1964 as a result of the Beeching axe.

References

Disused railway stations in the Borough of West Lancashire
Former Lancashire and Yorkshire Railway stations
Railway stations in Great Britain opened in 1878
Beeching closures in England